Dhangar is a herding caste of people found in the Indian states of Maharashtra, Goa and Uttar Pradesh.
 
Dhangar may also refer to:

Dhangar, Madhya Pradesh, a town in Khurai tehsil, Madhya Pradesh
Dhangar, a dialect of Kurukh language